, there were about 4,600 electric vehicles registered in New Hampshire, accounting for 0.3% of all vehicles in the state.

Government policy
, the state government offers tax incentives of up to $1,600 for electric vehicle purchases.

Charging stations
, there were 271 public charging station ports in New Hampshire. , there were five public DC charging stations in New Hampshire.

The Infrastructure Investment and Jobs Act, signed into law in November 2021, allocates  to charging stations in New Hampshire.

, the state government recognizes I-89 and I-93 as potential charging station corridors, with plans for charging stations every .

References

New Hampshire
Road transportation in New Hampshire